LEDS-150 Land Electronic Defence System is an active protection system, developed by Saab Avitronics, a South African subsidiary of the Swedish aerospace and defence company, Saab.

The system is able to counter most known threats against armoured vehicles with soft and hard kill methods.

LEDS-150 consists of laser warning sensors, an ADC-150 Active Defence Controller, a number of MCTS Munition Confirmation and Tracking Sensors, and High Speed Directed Launchers, HSDL, which allows the combination of soft- and hard-kill countermeasure deployment capability to the platform, optional displays, and interconnecting harnesses.

This system uses the Denel Dynamics Mongoose-1 missile to destroy the incoming threat in 5 to 15 meters distance from the protected vehicle.
LEDS-150 covers all 360 degrees azimuth; its elevation coverage is from -15 to +65 degrees.

The system has been integrated on the MOWAG Piranha armoured personnel carrier.

The South African Army has funded much of the development of this system.

External links 
Saab's official page for LEDS

References 

Armoured fighting vehicle equipment
Weapons countermeasures
Land active protection systems